Portrait of Francesco Maria della Rovere is a 1536-1538 oil on canvas painting of Francesco Maria I della Rovere, Duke of Urbino by Titian, now in the Uffizi in Florence. Signed TITIANVS F.[ECIT], it forms a pair with the same artist's Portrait of Eleonora Gonzaga della Rovere, Francesco's wife, also in the Uffizi.

Francesco Maria della Rovere
1538 paintings
Paintings in the collection of the Uffizi